The Besides EP is an album of J.Viewz, released on March 20, 2008.

Track listing
 "Smooth Criminal" - 3:53
 "Yasmin Levy – Naci en Alamo (J.Viewz Remix)" - 3:34
 "Nina Simone – See Line Woman (J.Viewz Remix)" - 4:24
 "Move Change" - 4:37
 "When Silent It Speaks (Feat. Glen Velez)" - 5:40
 "Under The Sun (Live Version)" - 6:34

References 
 J.Viewz on myspace
 Discogs.com
 J.Viewz website

2008 EPs